James Oliver Jones (born 13 March 1997) is a Welsh professional footballer who plays as a defender for Altrincham.

Career
Born in Wrexham, Jones began his career with The New Saints, moving on loan to Gresford Athletic in August 2015. He then spent three seasons with Altrincham, where he made 115 appearances in all competitions. In July 2020, he signed for Barrow.
On 28 July 2022 Jones re-signed for Altrincham.

Career statistics

References

1997 births
Living people
Welsh footballers
Association football defenders
The New Saints F.C. players
Gresford Athletic F.C. players
Altrincham F.C. players
Barrow A.F.C. players
Cymru Premier players
Northern Premier League players
National League (English football) players
English Football League players